Einar Árni Jóhannsson (born 8 January 1977) is an Icelandic basketball coach. He won the Icelandic men's championship in 1998 with Njarðvík as an assistant to Friðrik Ingi Rúnarsson, and in 2006 as Njarðvík's head coach. He won the Icelandic Men's Basketball Cup in 2005 with Njarðvík and was named the Úrvalsdeild karla Coach of the Year in 2007.

Coaching career
Einar served as an assistant coach to Njarðvík's men's team from 1997 to 2000 and from December 2003 to the end of the 2003–04 season.

In April 2015, Einar signed a three-year contract to coach Þór Þorlákshöfn. On February 17, 2018, Þór announced that Einar would leave his post as head coach at the seasons end and would be replaced by assistant coach Baldur Þór Ragnarsson.

On March 25, 2018, Einar was hired as the head coach of Njarðvík men's team. He left his post at the conclusion of the 2020–21 season. On 18 May 2021, he was hired as a coach of recently relegated Höttur.

Personal life
Einar is married to Guðmunda Guðlaug Sveinsdóttir.

Awards and accomplishments

Club honours
Icelandic Men's Champion (2): 19981, 2006
Icelandic Men's Basketball Cup (2): 19991, 2005
Icelandic Men's Supercup (5): 19991,2004, 2005, 2006, 2016, 2017
Icelandic Women's Supercup: 2002
Icelandic Men's Company Cup champion: 2005
Icelandic Men's Division I: 2008
1 as an assistant coach

Individual awards
Úrvalsdeild Men's Coach of the Year: 2007
Úrvalsdeild Women's Coach of the Year: 2003
1. deild karla Coach of the Year: 2008

References

1977 births
Living people
Einar Árni Jóhannsson
Einar Árni Jóhannsson
Einar Árni Jóhannsson
Einar Árni Jóhannsson
Einar Árni Jóhannsson
Einar Árni Jóhannsson
Einar Árni Jóhannsson
Einar Árni Jóhannsson